The Scottish Junior Football League (SJL) was a Scottish football competition that, through various incarnations, existed from 1892 to 1947.

It was based in the west of Scotland and largely consisted of Junior clubs that were not considered good enough for the major leagues of the time i.e. the Glasgow Junior Football League (GJL), the Central Junior Football League and the Lanarkshire Junior Football League.

History 
The first SJL was formed in 1892 but, despite its title, was effectively a Glasgow district league. It was formed by ten clubs: five from the city and five from the neighbouring districts. Ashfield, Benburb, Parkhead and Vale of Clyde were among its founding members. While it was seen as reasonably successful by the district sides, the city sides did not share that view and all five left at the end of the season. The league continued for one more season but was wound up in 1894.

The second SJL was a continuation of the Glasgow and District Junior League. It lost three of its city members in 1900, and after replacing them decided to rename itself. Its main problems were its inability to attract any of the major sides – these clubs aspired to be in the GJL – and its high turnover in membership. In all the league lasted only four years.

The third, and main, SJL was formed by seven of the clubs who lost their places in the Glasgow Junior League "great betrayal" scandal of 1908. Twelve teams enlisted in its initial season including Bellshill Athletic, Blantyre Victoria and Pollok. Given little hope by its critics, this version prospered and lasted until 1946. It was initially confined to the Glasgow district, but soon extended to include sides from Bute, Clackmannanshire, Ayrshire and Stirlingshire. After a year, a Second Division was added with automatic promotion and relegation. Because of World War I, it operated with one division from 1915 until 1919, when the Second Division was reintroduced. The SJL's main problem was it remained in the shadow of the GJL, to which most of its members aspired. Over the years the SJL lost many of its stronger clubs including Shawfield and Shettleston in 1921. A protest to the Scottish Junior Football Association (SJA) was lost on a technicality, however the loss of St Anthony's and St Roch's a year later led to another protest to the SJA and a subsequent charge of poaching. The GJL refused to hand these two clubs back, resulting in another of the GJL's splits with the SJA. The resulting formation of a Second Division saw the SJL lose a further five clubs. After the dispute was over a year later, the SJL admitted some of the GJL's discarded teams.

In 1923 the SJL re-organised its divisions into East and West sections – the winners playing off for the title – but the Second Division was reintroduced after two years.

The Intermediate dispute of 1927 saw the defection of eight of its clubs to the new Scottish Intermediate Football League, and the subsequent recruitment of several clubs from the defunct Stirlingshire Junior Football League made it necessary to return to the East/West sections.

The wide geographical spread of its clubs made life difficult for the league after 1939. Two wartime editions were played in 1939–40 and 1940–41 but the league subsequently suspended its operations for the rest of World War II. An attempted revival in 1945 was put off for a year, but the Central Junior Football League's refusal to hand back co-opted teams from the war essentially killed the SJL off. It attempted one more season and disbanded.

During its lifetime, the league provided an avenue for many clubs to participate in the Junior game. The principal leagues of the time were more or less closed shops, and the SJL's members may never have played at this level had it not been around.

Winners 

Scottish Junior League

SJL Victory Cup

SJL Victory Consolation Cup

References

Defunct football leagues in Scotland
Defunct Scottish Junior Football Association leagues
Sports leagues established in 1892
1892 establishments in Scotland
1947 disestablishments in Scotland
Sports leagues disestablished in 1947